Sir Richard Biddulph Martin, 1st Baronet (12 May 1838 – 23 August 1916) was an English banker and Liberal Party (and later Liberal Unionist) politician.

Martin was the older of two sons of Robert Martin (1808–1897) of Overbury Court near Tewkesbury in Gloucestershire and his wife, Mary Ann (d. 1892), who was the daughter of John Biddulph of the banking firm of Cocks, Biddulph & Co. His younger brother John Biddulph Martin was also a banker and statistician.  Robert Martin was a partner of the Grasshopper Bank, which later became Martins Bank.

He was educated at Harrow School and at Exeter College, Oxford, before joining his maternal grandfather's bank. He later became one of the founders of the British North Borneo Company and of the Institute of Bankers.

Martin first stood for election to the House of Commons at the 1868 general election, when he was an unsuccessful candidate in the Eastern division of Worcestershire. He was unsuccessful again in next candidacy, at the 1880 general election in the City of London.

However, 3 months later he was elected as Member of Parliament (MP) for Tewkesbury at a by-election held in July 1880 after the result of the general election in April was overturned on petition. Several of his ancestors had held the seat in the past, but Richard was the last Martin to represent Tewkesbury. The Parliamentary Borough of Tewkesbury was abolished under the Reform Act 1885 and replaced with a wider county division of Gloucestershire.

At the 1885 general election, he did not stand for re-election in the new Tewkesbury division of Gloucestershire, contesting instead the Chelmsford division of Essex, but without success.

When the Liberal Party split over Irish Home Rule, he joined the breakaway Liberal Unionist Party, and stood as a Liberal Unionist in the Ashburton division of Devon, again without success. He finally returned to Parliament at the  1892 general election as MP for the Droitwich division of Worcestershire, replacing the Liberal Unionist John Corbett, who had retired. Martin remained Droitwich's MP until he stood down at the 1906 general election.

He was made a baronet on 12 December 1905, of Overbury Court, in Gloucestershire. He died childless, and the title became extinct on his death.

He was Prime Warden of the Fishmongers' Company from 1899 to 1900, and President of the Royal Statistical Society from 1906 to 1907.

References

External links 
 
 Richard Biddulph Martin in the National Register of Archives

1838 births
1916 deaths
Liberal Party (UK) MPs for English constituencies
UK MPs 1880–1885
Liberal Unionist Party MPs for English constituencies
UK MPs 1892–1895
UK MPs 1895–1900
UK MPs 1900–1906
Baronets in the Baronetage of the United Kingdom
People educated at Harrow School
Alumni of Exeter College, Oxford
Members of the Parliament of the United Kingdom for Droitwich
Members of the Parliament of the United Kingdom for Tewkesbury
Presidents of the Royal Statistical Society
Members of the Privy Council of Ireland